Harald Wust (14 January 1921 – 2 October 2010) was a General of the German Air Force and served as Inspector General of the Bundeswehr from 1976 until 1978.

External links
Biography on BMVg website

1921 births
2010 deaths
Inspectors General of the Bundeswehr
Deputy Chief of Staff of the Federal Armed Forces
Generals of the German Air Force
Commanders Crosses of the Order of Merit of the Federal Republic of Germany
Military personnel from Kiel